Split hand/foot malformation (ectrodactyly) type 3 pseudogene 1, also known as SHFM3P1, is a human gene.

References

Further reading

Pseudogenes